The British School is a private international school in Sanepa, Kathmandu, Bagmati Province, Nepal. It was established in 1966 to serve the British community but is an inclusive school which has over 40 different nationalities and over 500 students as of 2020. The British school offers education from nursery and foundation up to Year 13.

The British School does many events over the course of the year. Some of these events are Sports Day, International Day, Productions, and many more.

It delivers the English National Curriculum with full-time UK recruited staff. It plans to move to a purpose-built new school with capacity large enough for around 650 students.

The school has its own artificial turf pitches, two multi-purpose sports areas, science laboratories, and two libraries, one for primary and one for secondary. It also has many small gardens, a duck pond, and parking for staff and students, including bike stands.

History 
The British School Started in 1966 as a school for British and Commonwealth parents who wanted British style education for their children. The school originally contained Primary Education.  On the 7th of July 1967, the Government of Nepal gave official recognition to The British School and has since been supported by the British Embassy

In 1997, the school expanded its curriculum to include Key Stage 3 students and they moved their campus to Jhamsikhel, Lalitpur.

In February 1998, the Prince of Wales opened the new campus.

In August 2004, the school expanded its curriculum to include A-Levels

Academics

Primary

Key Stage 1

Foundation 1 
In Foundation 1, Students are taught with a play-based curriculum. It is aimed to develop Communication, Maths, Literacy as well as early versions of History, Geography, ICT, Art, Music and Drama. Students also engage in Outdoor Learning, where they go outside and explore the outdoors.

Foundation 2 
Foundation 2 is very similar to Foundation 1, however there are more advanced topics in Subjects and students are prepared to enter Year 1

Year 1 
Year One teaches Key Stage 1 Maths and Phase 2 Phonics, as well as IPC.'. Students get Exercise books from the school.

Year 2 
Year Two is very similar to Year One, however there are more advanced topics in Subjects like Stage 3 and 5 phonics and students are prepared to enter Key Stage 2

Key Stage 2

Year 3 
In Year Three, students have subjects such as English, Maths, IPC, World Languages (formerly Modern Foreign Languages), Nepali, as well as having 30 minute assembly. Students also get access to After School Clubs.

Year 4 
In Year Four, students have the same subjects as Year 3, but have more advanced topics in Maths and English. Topics in IPC are also different.

Year 5 
In Year Five, students have the same subjects as Year 3 and 4, but have more advanced topics in Maths and English. Topics in IPC are also different

Year 6 
In Year Five, students have the same subjects as Year 3, 4 and 5, but have more advanced topics in Maths and English. Topics in IPC are also different. Students are also prepared to enter Key Stage 3

Secondary

Key Stage 3

Year 7 & 8 
In Year 7 & 8 Students have the subjects Maths, English, Science (Biology, Chemistry, Physics), History, Geography, Art, Drama, Music, Performing Arts Workshop (PAWs), Physical Education (PE), ICT/Computer Science Design and Technology and Information Literacy (DT). Students also have to pick 2 languages from French, Spanish, Mandarin and Nepali. Students also have an extra period at the beginning of the day called mentor time, where Notices are shared and students participate in Well-being activities. Students are required to either bring a Tablet or Laptop, or borrow one from the School however phones aren't allowed in class. Students will now have to source their own equipment such as Stationary and Calculators.

Year 9 
Year 9 is very similar to year 8, however students get more opportunities for leadership roles and are prepared to enter Key Stage 4, with a day that resembles Year 10 and IGSCE option evenings.

Events

Drama

Dragon Days (2019) 
Dragon Days was a play performed by Key Stage 2

High School Musical JR. (12th March 2020 - 13th March 2020) 
High School Musical Jr. was a musical performed by Secondary that was based on a Disney Channel Movie called High School Musical

Porridge! (2020) 
Porridge was a cancelled play meant to be performed by Key Stage 2

Shakespeare Festival (4th April 2022 - 2nd May 2022) 
The Shakespeare festival is a Drama Festival where Years 3-9 Perform Shakespeare Plays.

 Year 3&4 - Shakespeare Rocks
 Year 5&6 - The Tempest
 Year 7 - A Midsummer-Night's Dream
 Year 8 - The Tragedy Of Macbeth
 Year 9 - Romeo and Juliet

Sports

House Competition (28th February 2022 - 1st April 2022) 
A competition where each Year Group between Year 3 and Year 11 played different sport games every week to earn points for their house

References 

Schools in Kathmandu
British international schools in Asia
International schools in Nepal
Educational institutions established in 1963
1963 establishments in Nepal
Schools offering Cambridge International Examinations
Schools in Nepal